Aporocidaris milleri is a species of sea urchin of the family Ctenocidaridae. Their armour is covered with spines. It is placed in the genus Aporocidaris and lives in the sea. Aporocidaris milleri was first scientifically described in 1898 by Alexander Emanuel Agassiz.

See also 
 Aporocidaris fragilis
 Aporocidaris incerta
 Aporocidaris usarpi

References 

Ctenocidaridae
Animals described in 1898